The 2021 Oklahoma Sooners softball team was an American college softball team that represented the University of Oklahoma during the 2021 NCAA Division I softball season.  The Sooners were led by Patty Gasso in her twenty-seventh season, and played their home games at OU Softball Complex. They competed in the Big 12 Conference, where they finished the season with a 56–4 record, including 16–1 in conference play.

The Sooners won the 2021 Big 12 Tournament, and qualified for the 2021 NCAA Division I softball tournament. They advanced to the 2021 Women's College World Series, where they defeated Florida State in three games to win their fifth championship in program history. The Sooners homered in 58 of their 60 games, including 45 multi-home run games, and set the NCAA Division I single-season record for team batting average (.405), team slugging percentage (.778), on-base percentage (.490), home runs (161), runs scored (638), runs per game (10.63), home runs per game (2.68) and total bases (1,279). They also set Women's College World Series records for home runs (15), runs scored (49) and hits (67).

Roster

Schedule

Rankings

Awards and honors

References

Oklahoma
Oklahoma Softball
Oklahoma
Big 12 Conference softball champion seasons
NCAA Division I softball tournament seasons
Oklahoma Sooners softball seasons
Women's College World Series seasons